Nurul Hussain is an Asom Gana Parishad politician from Assam. He was elected in Assam Legislative Assembly elections in 1996 and 2001 from Hajo constituency.

References 

Living people
Asom Gana Parishad politicians
Assam MLAs 1996–2001
Assam MLAs 2001–2006
People from Baksa district
Year of birth missing (living people)